Peleioholani (1690–1770) was a Hawaiian High Chief, Alii nui of Kauai and Alii nui of Oahu. He ruled an empire stretching from Niihau to Molokai. According to ancient traditions, Peleʻioholani was a descendant of Hema and thru Māweke.

Reign 
At its greatest sizes, during Peleʻioholani's reign, Kingdom of Oʻahu island stretched from Niihau, in the west, to the District of Koʻolau, on Molokaʻi, in the east; although power were nominal no matter the size. 

He ruled as titular king or chieftain of Kauai, Oahu and held tributary over Molokai after he conquered that island and slew the Molokaian chiefs for killing his daughter Keelanihonuaiakama.

Name 
Peleʻioholani is sometimes called Peleʻiholani. Early Western sailors to Hawaii such as Captain James Cook called him Perreeorannee.

Family 
Parents of Peleʻioholani were High Chief Kūaliʻi Kunuiakea Kuikealaikauaokalani and his wife Kalanikahimakeialii and he had a sister called Kukuiaimakalani.

Kūmahana was a son of Peleʻioholani by his first wife Halakii. Peleioholani's daughters were Kuwalu, Kalanipoʻo-a-Peleʻioholani, Kaʻapuwai and Keʻelaniihonuaiakama.

Granddaughter of Peleioholani was Queen Kamakahelei. Kuwalu was the mother of Chief Ahu-a-I.

Another wife of Peleioholani was named Lonokahikini.

See also 
Gideon Peleioholani Laanui

References

 Abraham Fornander, An Account of the Polynesian Race: Its Origin and Migrations, Rutland, VT: Charles E. Tuttle Company, 1969.
Ruling chiefs of Hawaii by Samuel Kamakau

1770 deaths
Royalty of Oahu
Royalty of Kauai and Niihau
18th-century monarchs in Oceania
Year of birth unknown